The 11th Strategic Division (Abbr.: 11 DIV STRAT), stylized XI Division, was a division-sized combat formation of the Malaysian Army.

The XI Division was the only division-sized combat formation made completely of army reserve officers and men from the Malaysian Armed Forces Reserve until it was transformed into a strategic division on 2 May 1984. On 31 December 1993, the division was disbanded. What remained of its headquarters, including personnel and facilities, was absorbed into the newly formed Malaysian Army Training and Doctrine Command.

History

Founded as an infantry combat formation 
This combat formation was established in 1969 as the 11th Infantry Division at Damansara Camp in Kuala Lumpur as a combat formation for the Malaysian Army to defend Malay Peninsula in the event of an armed conflict. It was established as a result of a collaboration between the Ministry of Defense and the University of Malaya, which at the time wanted to build a garrison for the university's reserve army. As part of the agreement between the Ministry of Defense and the University of Malaya, the garrison was built by the federal government on the university's land, but the garrison must be shared with the headquarters of the 11th Infantry Division.

The division's headquarters remained in Damansara Camp until the year 1984, when it was relocated to Imphal Camp in Kuala Lumpur. The 8th Infantry Brigade is one of the formations under the command of the 11th Infantry Division.

Restructured to an army reserve combat formation 
On 1 January 1980, the army command redesignated the 11th Infantry Division as the 11th Reserve Army Division, or Divisyen ke-11 Pasukan Simpanan Tentera Darat (: 11 DIV (PSTD)) in Malay. Its new role is to coordinate all reserve units under the Malaysian Army. Prior to this, the reserve army was not centralized, and its discipline was not as strict as that of the regular army. Many issues, especially logistics, were minimised under the command of the 11th Reserve Army Division.

Restructured to an experimental combat formation 
On 2 May 1984, the 11th Reserve Army Division was restructured as the 11th Strategic Division, with the division's responsibilities including experimenting with military strategy and logistics so the Malaysian Army could have advantages in combat. On 1 March 1987, the 11 DIV STRAT chose the 8th Battalion of the Royal Ranger Regiment to be trained as an airborne unit in order to analyse its combat effectiveness. By July 1990, the efficiency of the airborne unit in combat had been recognised by higher command. As a result, two more battalions were selected to be converted to airborne roles at the end of 1990 and in 1992.

The units that were under the command of the 11th Strategic Division at the time included the 10th Strategic Brigade (now known as the 10th Parachute Brigade) and 8th Squadron, Royal Army Engineers Regiment.

Dissolved 
The Malaysian Army dissolved the 11th Strategic Division on 31 December 1993. The personnel and facilities of the 11 DIV STRAT HQ were absorbed into the newly established Malaysian Army Training and Doctrine Command.

References 

Malaysian Army
Formations of the Malaysian Army